The Ampoița is a left tributary of the river Ampoi in Romania. It discharges into the Ampoi near the village Ampoița.

References

Rivers of Alba County
Rivers of Romania